Op een Avond in Mei is a 1936 Dutch comedy film directed by Jaap Speyer.

Cast

External links 
 

1937 films
Dutch black-and-white films
1937 comedy films
Films directed by Jaap Speyer
Dutch comedy films
1930s Dutch-language films